Kamran Khan was a Pakistani politician and businessman who served as a member of Senate of Pakistan between 1973 and 1977.

He was the father of Chief Justice of Pakistan Nasir-ul-Mulk.

References

Members of the Senate of Pakistan
Year of birth missing
Year of death missing